Theodore M. Petok (1917–2010) was an American cartoonist, illustrator, animator and film producer. He won Academy Award for Best Animated Short Film in 1971 for The Crunch Bird.

Career
After graduating from school in 1934, Petok attended an art school in Chicago, but stayed there only six months and then worked as a cartoonist for various New York newspapers. In 1935 he returned to Detroit, where he worked as an advertising artist for a local advertising company. After the end of the Second World War - from 1942 to 1946 he was in the US Army Signal Corps and most recently held the highest rank of captain - Petok opened a studio for advertising graphics in Detroit and specialized in animated advertising.

Petok soon turned completely to animation, initially working at Earl Klein's animation studio, Animation Inc., and eventually joining Ernest Pintoff's Pintoff Studios. In 1969, Petok founded his own animation film studio, Ted Petok Studios, which he renamed Crunch Bird Studios in 1971. He concentrated on traditional hand-drawn animation and, in addition to commercials, also made humorous short cartoons. Together with Len Maxwell (dubbing) and Joe Petrovich (animation) they created the three-minute animated film The Crunch Bird, which Petok submitted to the Oscar competition as a producer on the advice of a cinema operator from Detroit. The film won the 1971 Academy Award for Best Animated Short Film. In 1975, Crunch Bird II was made as a sequel; In 1981 numerous other short films about the Crunch Bird were released.

Petok produced and animated over two dozen cartoons, created animations for Sesame Street and The Electric Company, and numerous commercials. In 1989 he gave the Crunch Bird Studios to his eldest son.

Death
Petok died of heart failure in 2010 and was buried in Beth El Memorial Park in Livonia, Michigan.

Filmography
1971: The Crunch Bird
1974: The Mad Baker
1975: Crunch Bird II
1975: Yeecch
1975: Stash
1976: The Golfer
1981: Yetta the Yenta
1981: The Geneticist
1981: The Hospital
1981: Parrot
1981: Charm School
1981: You Dirty Bird
1981: The Execution
1981: The Guru
1981: Indians
1981: Kink Konk
1981: Love
1981: Missing You
1981: Pet Shop
1981: Pollution
1981: The Psychiatrist
1981: Little Red Riding Hood
1981: The Russians
1981: Talking Bird
1981: Zoo

Bibliography
Theodore (Ted) Petok. In: Jeff Lenburg: Who's who in animated cartoons. Applause, New York 2006, pp. 284–285.
Joe Rossiter: Ted Petok: Cartoonist won Oscar in '71 for short film. In: Detroit Free Press April 22, 2010, p. 17.

References

1917 births
2010 deaths
American animators
Artists from New York City
American animated film directors
American animated film producers
American surrealist artists
Surrealist filmmakers
Film directors from New York City
Film producers from New York (state)
20th-century American inventors